Pitcairnia albiflos is a species of bromeliad in the genus Pitcairnia. This species is endemic to Brazil.

This white-flowered species often hybridizes with the red-flowered Pitcairnia staminea, producing pink-flowered offspring.

References

External links

albiflos
Flora of Brazil